John Lycett (1804-1882) was an English paleontologist. He was a physician at Minchinhampton from  c.1840-1860. In 1860 he moved to Scarborough in Yorkshire and the "wide dispersal of his magnificent collection of fossils from this area [quarries on Minchinhampton Common ] commenced". His monograph on the Great Oolite is one of just a handful of monographs describing and illustrating the British Jurassic gastropod and bivalve fauna.

He was awarded the Lyell Medal by the Geological Society of London in 1882.

Works 
1851-1854 with the geologist John Morris A monograph of the Mollusca from the Great Oolite. Volume 1, Chiefly from Minchinhampton and the coast of Yorkshire (in three parts published between 1850 and 1854, covering cephalopods, gastropods and worms as well as bivalves).
1863 with John Morris A Monograph of the Mollusca from the Great Oolite Supplement - Volume 2: Mollusca from the Stonesfield Slate, Great Oolite, Forest Marble, and Cornbrash.  
1857 The Cotteswold Hills. Hand-book introductory to their geology and palaeontology. Piper, Stephenson and Spence, London.

Taxa established by Morris & Lycett 
partial list
Megalodontidae Morris & Lycett, 1853
Purpuroidea Lycett, 1848
Nododelphinula buckmani (Morris & Lycett, 1850
Amberleya J. Morris & Lycett, 1851
Plagiostoma bellula Morris and Lycett 1853

References
 
Hugh S. Torrens and Michael A. Taylor Collections, collectors and  museums of note No. 55 Geological collectors and museums in Cheltenham 1810-1988 A case history and its lessons Geological Curator, Vol.5, No.5, 1990 (for 1988), pp. 175–213 online pdf
Lambrecht W, Quenstedt W, Quenstedt A. (1938) Palaeontologi: Catalogus bio-bibliographicus. Fossilium Catalogus I: Animalia 72: 1–495. [reprinted 1978, Arno Press, New York]
Cleevely R.J. (1983) World palaeontological collections. British Museum (Natural History) and Mansell, London, 365 pp.

English palaeontologists
1882 deaths
1804 births
Lyell Medal winners